Tilen Finkšt (born 6 July 1997) is a Slovenian professional road racing cyclist, who currently rides for UCI Continental team . He also competes in track cycling, having rode in four events at the 2020 UEC European Track Championships.

Major results
2015
 1st  Road race, National Junior Road Championships
2019
 3rd Croatia–Slovenia
2020
 2nd Coppa Città di San Daniele
 3rd Poreč Trophy
2021
 National Track Championships
1st  Team sprint
2nd Team pursuit
 3rd Poreč Trophy
 4th Puchar Ministra Obrony Narodowej
 10th GP Slovenian Istria
2022
 1st  Team pursuit, National Track Championships
 2nd GP Gorenjska
 3rd GP Kranj
 4th Road race, Mediterranean Games
 4th Poreč Trophy
 7th Overall Belgrade Banjaluka
 9th GP Slovenian Istria
2023
 1st Stage 3 Istrian Spring Trophy
 5th Poreč Trophy

References

External links

1997 births
Living people
Slovenian male cyclists